Declared historic buildings' of Hangzhou are districts, artifacts or buildings legally declared to be "protected". According to the "Regularations of historic districts and historic buildings in Hangzhou" effectivated from 1 January 2005, historic buildings are those artifacts or districts that have lasted more than 50 years, and of significant values for history, science, and art study. In Hangzhou, declaring a historic building requires consulting the urban planning administration bureau, and the real estate administration bureau.

As of 31 June 2011, there are 287 declared historic buildings in Hangzhou, proclaimed as 5 batches.[17] In the near future, it is going to issue the sixth batch which includes 51 historic houses.

75 buildings were declared to be the first batch of historic buildings in Hangzhou, in May 2004. The following information is provided by Real Estate Admiustration Bureau & Research Institute for Historic buildings in  Hangzhou.

References

Buildings and structures in Hangzhou